Women Football Club Varna, or simple WFC Varna is a Bulgarian women's football club from the city of Varna. It was founded in 1982 and competes in the Bulgarian women's football championship since its establishment in 1985–86. The team won the title ten times in ten consecutive seasons – from 1994 to 2003; won the Bulgarian Women's Cup six times; and the Albena Cup in 1994. Grand Hotel Varna participated in the qualifying round of the 2001–02 UEFA Women's Cup competition. The team changed their name to FC Varna in 2009, and eventually to WFC Varna in 2012, after moving to a new ground – Spartak Stadium in Varna.

Titles

Official
 Bulgarian women's championship (10)
 Champion: 1993–94, 1994–95, 1995–96, 1996–97, 1997–98, 1998–99, 1999–00, 2000–01, 2001–02, 2002–03
 Bulgarian Women's Cup (6)
 Winner: 1990–91, 1994–95, 1997–98, 1998–99, 1999–00, 2001–02

Invitational
 Albena Cup (1)
 Winner: 1994

European tournaments history

References

External links
bgclubs.eu
soccerway.com

Association football clubs established in 1982
Women's football clubs in Bulgaria
Football clubs in Varna, Bulgaria
1982 establishments in Bulgaria